The Canadian Hurricane Centre (CHC) is an organisation that monitors and warns of the threat of tropical cyclones such as hurricanes and tropical storms. CHC is a division of the Meteorological Service of Canada, which is in turn an agency of Environment Canada. Founded in 1987, CHC provides guidance to MSC's weather centres in eastern and Atlantic Canada, and is based in Dartmouth, Nova Scotia.  CHC frequently consults with its United States counterpart, the National Hurricane Center in Miami, to coordinate the tracks and positions of storms that pose a threat to Canada.

History
1985's Hurricane Gloria and its less-than-expected damage prompted Environment Canada to create the CHC due to confusion between information received from the US National Hurricane Centre and US media and on-the-ground information and observations. Its first hurricane warnings were issued in 2008 for Hurricane Kyle, which struck near Yarmouth, Nova Scotia on September 28, 2008, and quickly became extratropical while maintaining much of its strength into New Brunswick and Labrador.

Duties
The organization gathers information on tropical and post-tropical cyclones (systems in the process of becoming extratropical cyclones), predicts their evolution and assesses their potential impact on Canada. Like other hurricane centres, the Canadian Hurricane Centre makes presentations about tropical cyclones to schools, businesses, the media, and other governmental agencies. They also coordinate with the public concerning additional queries about hurricanes in Canada.

Frequency
While hurricanes are relatively uncommon in Canada, they do approach or strike from time to time.  Recent occurrences include:
Hurricane Bob, which struck Campobello Island, New Brunswick, in 1991.
Hurricane Luis which struck Newfoundland in September 1995. 
Hurricane Hortense which struck Nova Scotia in September 1996.
Hurricane Michael, which struck Newfoundland in October 2000.
Hurricane Juan, which struck Nova Scotia in September 2003.
Hurricane Igor, which struck Newfoundland in September 2010.
Hurricane Larry, which struck Newfoundland in September 2021.
Hurricane Fiona which struck Nova Scotia in September 2022.
Also of note due to its rarity and the damage caused is Hurricane Hazel which hit Toronto, Ontario in 1954, and remained a strong storm even after crossing over the U.S. East Coast.

See also
 Caribbean Disaster Emergency Management Agency (CDEMA)

References

External links

 Official open data services for Canadian hurricane forecast data
Official Canadian weather warnings
Hurricane bulletins for wireless devices

Meteorological Service of Canada
1987 establishments in Nova Scotia
Government agencies established in 1987